The 1994 Florida Commissioner of Agriculture election took place on November 8, 1994 to elect the Florida Commissioner of Agriculture. Incumbent Democratic Commissioner Robert B. Crawford was re-elected to a second term in office.

References 

commissioner of agriculture
Florida Commissioner of Agriculture elections
Florida Commissioner of Agriculture